was first a railway station, then a signal station located in Kamiji (神路), Nakagawa, Nakagawa District (Teshio), Hokkaidō, Japan and was operated by the Japanese National Railways.

The station was in official service between 1922 and 1977 and continued as a signal station that allowed passenger use until 1985. In May 2005, the station house and all associated buildings were removed from the site by Hokkaido Railway Company, the operator of the line from 1987.

Lines serviced
Japanese National Railways
Sōya Main Line

Adjacent stations

External links
 Air photo around Kamiji Station 1977 (National Land Information Office of Japan)

Railway stations in Hokkaido Prefecture
Defunct railway stations in Japan
Railway stations in Japan opened in 1922
Railway stations closed in 1977